Lanjeth is a village near St Austell in Cornwall, England, United Kingdom. It is in the civil parish of St Stephen-in-Brannel

Its neighbouring smaller villages are St. Stephen, Foxhole, Trewoon, Sticker and Coombe. The A3058 road passes through the village. There is a park and allotments.

References

Villages in Cornwall